Fanuel Magangani is an Anglican bishop in Malawi: since 2010  he has been Bishop of Northern Malawi, one of the four  Malawian dioceses within the Church of the Province of Central Africa.

References

Anglican bishops of Northern Malawi
21st-century Anglican bishops in Malawi